The 2003 Minnesota Golden Gophers football team represented the University of Minnesota in the 2003 NCAA Division I-A football season. In their seventh year under head coach Glen Mason, the Golden Gophers compiled a 10–3 record and outscored their opponents by a combined total of 503 to 285.  The team made an appearance in the Sun Bowl. The 2003 Minnesota Golden Gophers football team was ranked 17th in the final USA Today/AFCA Coaches poll and 20th in the final Associated Press poll. This was the most recent season in which Minnesota defeated the Wisconsin Badgers and received Paul Bunyan's Axe until 2018.

Schedule

Roster

Game summaries

Wisconsin

Source: ESPN

References

Minnesota
Minnesota Golden Gophers football seasons
Sun Bowl champion seasons
Minnesota Golden Gophers football